Battle Cars is a racing video game for the Super NES that was developed by Malibu and published by Namco in 1993. It is a futuristic racing game in which cars are equipped with multiple weapons which are used to eliminate opponents.

Gameplay
The game can be played by either one or two players. In a one-player game, the player progresses through a series of progressively harder levels. The main game features nine levels, each with two race tracks; one cross-country and one circuit. Two players can alternate as each progresses through the levels of the one-player game, or they may go head-to-head in a number of race tracks. The main game features nine levels, each with two race tracks; one cross-country and one circuit.

The game is set in a post-apocalyptic world in which the sport of choice is a violent auto race called "Battle Cars." The player can select from three vehicles at the start of the game in a variety of colors, to be played for the duration of the game. The choices are a spiked vehicle, a hot rod, and a formula one-style race car. The vehicles driven by the level bosses are unavailable to play in the main game, but the first three bosses’ vehicles are available in 2 player single races, including alternate colors.

The player can upgrade their vehicle by spending cash earned by defeating enemies on cross-country circuits. Each category may be upgraded to level eight. The game features three weapons: Missiles (which home in on another racer once shot), Disks (which fire straight in front of your car and bounce around the race track until they hit another racer) and Grenades (which are thrown ahead of other racers and explode on contact). These can be upgraded up to five levels, each increasing in speed and accuracy. Weapon upgrades are purchased using credits obtained from quickly completing Cross-Country races.

Single exhibition races can also be played in 2 player mode where 2 players face off in split screen.

Reception

Notes

References

1993 video games
Science fiction racing games
Malibu Interactive games
Multiplayer and single-player video games
Namco games
North America-exclusive video games
Post-apocalyptic video games
Super Nintendo Entertainment System games
Super Nintendo Entertainment System-only games
Vehicular combat games
Video games developed in the United States
Video games scored by David Whittaker
Video games set in Detroit
Video games set in Japan